Tailspin Tommy in the Great Air Mystery is a 12-episode 1935 Universal movie serial based on the Tailspin Tommy comic strip by Hal Forrest and starring Clark Williams, Jean Rogers and Noah Beery, Jr. The picture was the 96th of the 137 serials released by the studio (the 28th of which to be made with sound).

Plot
"Tailspin" Tommy (Clark Williams) and his fellow pilots, Betty Lou Barnes (Jean Rogers) and Skeeter Milligan (Noah Beery, Jr.) prevent a group of corrupt businessmen from stealing Nazil Island's oil reserves.  The villains are Manuel Casmetto (Herbert Heywood), the half-brother of Don Alvarado Casmetto, Nazil Island's ruler and villainous oil tycoon Horace Raymore (Matthew Betz).

Tommy and his friends are aided in their efforts by news reporter Bill McGuire (James P. Burtis). Milt Howe (Pat J. O'Brien), a masked mystery plot known as The Eagle and El Condor stands in their way. When Tommy is triumphant, he also finds he has a movie contract.

Chapter titles

 Wreck of the Dirigible
 The Roaring Fire God
 Hurled from the Skies
 A Bolt from the Blue
 The Torrent
 Flying Death
 The Crash in the Clouds
 Wings of Disaster
 Crossed and Double Crossed
 The Dungeon of Doom
 Desperate Chances
 The Last Stand
Source:

Cast

 Clark Williams as "Tailspin" Tommy Tompkins
 Jean Rogers as Betty Lou Barnes, one of "Tailspin" Tommy's companions
 Delphine Drew as Inez Casmetto
 Noah Beery, Jr. as Skeeter Milligan, one of "Tailspin" Tommy's companions
 Bryant Washburn as Ned Curtis, Betty's uncle and a heroic oil tycoon
 Pat J. O'Brien as Milt Howe
 Herbert Heywood as Manuel Casmetto
 Matthew Betz as Horace Raymore
 Paul Ellis as Enrico Garcia, Don Casmetto's secretary and Manuel Casmetto's henchman
 Harry Worth as Don Alvarado Casmetto
 Manuel López as Gomez
 Charles A. Browne as Paul Smith
 James P. Burtis as Bill McGuire, a reporter
 Frank Mayo as the Dirigible Captain
 Frank Clarke as a flyer, (billed as "Air Ace Frank Clark")

Production
Tailspin Tommy in the Great Air Mystery used a number of aircraft including a Fleet biplane, a Stearman C3 and a Fairchild cabin monoplane. A mock-up of a dirigible included an interior section. Although Nazil was in South America, all the location shooting took place in California with the Wilson airport as a staging area.

Stunts
 Frank Clarke, stunt pilot
 George DeNormand

Reception
Tailspin Tommy in the Great Air Mystery is considered to be an improvement on the previous Tailspin Tommy serial.

In the review for Turner Classic Movies, the author wrote, "'Tailspin Tommy in the Great Air Mystery '(1935) sees our three cheerful pilots foiling a conspiracy in the Latin American country of Nazil, where American gangsters have conspired with an usurper to steal the country's oil reserves. Making use of considerable new flying footage, the serial opens with an impressive dirigible crash. Tommy (Clark Williams), Betty Lou (Jean Rogers) and Skeeter (Noah Beery, Jr.) must fight a masked flier called the 'Double-X Pilot,' who leads a rogue fighter squadron based from a secret jungle fortress. Our heroes are occasionally aided by a mysterious aviator known as 'El Condor,' whose 'Eagle Plane' appears and disappears into an artificial cloud."

References

Notes

Citations

Bibliography

 Cline, William C. "Filmography". In the Nick of Time. Jefferson, North Carolina: McFarland & Company, Inc., 1984. .
 Farmer, James H. Celluloid Wings: The Impact of Movies on Aviation. Blue Ridge Summit, Pennsylvania: Tab Books Inc., 1984. .
 Harmon, Jim and Donald F. Glut. The Great Movie Serials: Their Sound and Fury. London: Routledge, 1973. .
 Weiss, Ken and Ed Goodgold. To be Continued ...: A Complete Guide to Motion Picture Serials. New York: Bonanza Books, 1973. .
 Wynne, H. Hugh. The Motion Picture Stunt Pilots and Hollywood's Classic Aviation Movies. Missoula, Montana: Pictorial Histories Publishing Co., 1987. .

External links
 
 

1935 films
1935 adventure films
American aviation films
American black-and-white films
1930s English-language films
Films based on comic strips
Films directed by Ray Taylor
Universal Pictures film serials
American adventure films
Films with screenplays by George H. Plympton
1930s American films